Terri Allard is an American country and folk singer-songwriter from Virginia. She was born in August 31, 1962. Her most recent album, Makes No Sense, features a song she wrote with Mary Chapin Carpenter. 

When not making music, Allard is the host of a television talk show on public television station WHTJ "Charlottesville Inside-Out". In 2017 she celebrated a decade with the show.

Early 
Allard attended Orange County High School in Orange, Virginia where she excelled in long distance running. She set record times in the one-mile and two-mile distances in 1980, the latter of which stood for many years. Phil Audibert, a local author and musician, gave Allard her first guitar lesson. As a fourth-grader, she sang "Leaving on a Jet Plane" at a 4-H talent contest, accompanied on the guitar by Extension agent Ted Carroll.

Her early contest recognition led to the Lion's Club Bland Music Contest and then folk concerts at the Four County Players theater in Barboursville. She and Mark Brookman, a Gordonsville, Virginia native, put together a musical duo "that was making people take notice."

After finishing college (well into her 20's), Allard decided to pursue her music. For a few years she performed weekly at Random Row, a bar in Charlottesville. She slowly built up a repertoire of original material, and developed a fan base. As she puts it, "Once I buckled down, I was very serious about it and very focused about it and started writing."

Billy Marshall Brockman, a fellow Orange County native, gave Allard the push she needed to launch her music career properly. "He taught me over half of what I know about music," she says.

Career 
Playing at a club in Harrisonburg one night, Allard and Brockman were on break, sitting at the bar, discussing music with a bartender named Dwayne. "I had a crush on him," Allard admits. Soon they were married.

Her new husband had a degree in marketing and "he taught me about it as well," Allard says. She produced her first CD in 1994, with four more to follow — "all of them released under the independent label she and Dwayne started."

While their friends were having children and buying cars and houses, Allard and her husband were plowing all their money into "running up and down the road, putting together press packets, marketing this product called Terri Allard." As she recalls:

Allard formed the Terri Allard Jazz Quartet with some of "the area's top musicians," including drummer Robert Jospé, pianist Bob Hallahan, and bassists Pete Spaar. The group performs popular jazz standards with favorites including those by Ella Fitzgerald, Sarah Vaughan, and Etta James.

Reception

Discography
 Terri Allard (1994)
 Rough Lines (1996)
 Loose Change and Spare Parts (1999)
 Makes No Sense (2002)
 Live From Charlottesville (2006)

Honors, awards, distinctions 
 "Best of CVille" songwriter winner.
 WAMMIE (Washington Area Music Award) for Best Female Country Vocalist.

Personal 
Allard's father Bill is also a musician. Her brother Scott A. Allard, a professional actor, died in 2005 of melanoma. Her son Will has performed with her band from a very young age.

References

External links
Official Web Site
"Guitar zone: Terri Allard and her evolving band"

1962 births
Living people
Songwriters from Virginia
American women singers
Folk musicians from Virginia
Jazz musicians from Virginia
Musicians from Charlottesville, Virginia
People from Barboursville, Virginia
21st-century American women